Bellis is a hamlet in central Alberta, Canada within Smoky Lake County. Previously an incorporated municipality, Bellis dissolved from village status on January 1, 1946 to become part of the Municipal District of Vilna No. 575.

The hamlet's name derives from the  "white woods", referring to the local birch and poplars. The first settlers arrived in 1898.

Demographics 

See also 
List of communities in Alberta
List of former urban municipalities in Alberta
List of hamlets in Alberta

References 

Designated places in Alberta
Former villages in Alberta
Hamlets in Alberta
Smoky Lake County
Ukrainian-Canadian culture in Alberta